The second series of the Israeli version of The Singer in the Mask premiered on Channel 12 on 16 October 2021 and concluded on 18 December 2021. The series was won by actor and singer Shai Gabso as "Gorilla" with actor Oz Zehavi finishing second as "Spaghetti" and singer and voice actress Rotem Shefy finishing third as "Oats".

Panelists and host 

The show is hosted by the television presenter Ido Rosenblum, with the judging panel comprising the journalist Ofira Asayag, the comedian Shahar Hason, the musical pop duo Static & Ben El Tavori, and the director Tzedi Tzarfati.

Guest panelists
Throughout the second season, various guest judges appeared alongside the original, for one episode.

These guest panelists have included:

Contestants

Episodes

Week 1 (October 16/17/18)

Week 2 (October 23/25/26)

Week 3 (October 31 & November 2/7)

Week 4 (November 8)

Week 5 (November 14 & 16)

Week 6 (November 20/22)

Week 7 (November 30/December 4)

Week 8 (December 6/December 11)

Week 9 - Semifinal & Final (December 13/December 18)

 Group Performance: "Rumor Has It" by Adele

References

Notes

External links
 

2021 Israeli television seasons
The Singer in the Mask